Joseph Archambault (February 17, 1879 – September 11, 1964) was a Canadian politician and lawyer.

Archambault was born in Montreal, Quebec, Canada. He was elected as a Member of the Liberal Party to the House of Commons of Canada in the 1917 election to represent the riding of Chambly—Verchères. He joined the anti-conscription Laurier Liberals on March 18, 1918 and was re-elected in the 1921 election.

External links 
 

1879 births
1964 deaths
Liberal Party of Canada MPs
Members of the House of Commons of Canada from Quebec
Lawyers from Montreal
Politicians from Montreal